The Cat and the Fiddle is Papa John Creach's sixth solo album and his first with DJM Records.  Bryan Tilford and Mark Leon who performed in the band Midnight Sun on Rock Father return for this album, but Kevin Moore otherwise known as Keb' Mo' moved on and was replaced on this album with Joey Brasler.

Track listing

Side One
"Country Boy, City Man" (Brian Tilford) – 3:19
"Keep on Rockin'" (Brian Cadd) – 3:43
"Livin' for Myself" (Donnell Jones) – 3:45
"Keep on Movin'" (Tom Seufert, Gregg Sutton) – 3:34
"Right Down" (Don Grady) – 3:40

Side Two
"Let's Get Dancin'" (Tilford) – 4:29
"Foxy Lady" (Steve Haberman) – 3:49
"Rock & Roll Music" (Tilford) – 4:00
"Give Me Another Chance" (Joey Brasler, Roy Sciacca) – 3:15
"Pop Stop" (Haberman) – 5:00

Personnel
Steve Haberman – keyboards
Bryan Tilford – bass, background vocals
Mark Leon – drums, background vocals
Joey Brasler – guitar
Reid King – background vocals
Papa John Creach – lead vocals, fiddle

Additional Personnel
Doug Riley - strings and horns arrangement
Tracy Richardson – background vocals
Rachel Oldfield – background vocals
Al Stahaley – lead vocals on "Keep on Rockin'" and "Rock & Roll Music"
Roy Sciacca – lead vocals on "Give Me Another Chance"
Scott Cushnie – solo keyboard on "Give Me Another Chance"
Bob Zimmitti – percussion

Production
Jack Richardson – producer
Keith Gravenhorst – producer, recording engineer
Rich Lowler, Dave McKinley, Steve Vaughan – recording technicians
Toronto Sound – tape mastering
Cub Richardson – disc mastering engineer
DFK / David Krieger – art direction
Jim McCrary – photography

Papa John Creach albums
1977 albums
Albums produced by Jack Richardson (record producer)